Kentucky Route 249 (KY 249) is a north–south state highway that traverses two counties in South Central Kentucky.

Route description 
KY 249 starts in the community of Flippin, in western Monroe County, at an intersection with KY 100. Almost immediately after its start, KY 249 intersects KY 678. It makes its way into Barren County a few miles later and goes through mainly rural areas of Barren County, including the community of Roseville. Once it reaches Glasgow, it crosses the Louie B. Nunn Cumberland Parkway via an overpass, and reaches its northern end at a junction with U.S. Route 31E Business (US 31E Bus.) on the south side of Glasgow not too far from the Southgate Shopping Center and the KY 63 junction.

Major intersections

References

0249
0249
0249